Allantula is a fungal genus in the family Pterulaceae. The genus is monotypic, containing the singles species Allantula diffusa, found in Brazil. The genus and species were described by British mycologist E.J.H. Corner in 1952.

See also
 List of Agaricales genera

References

 

Pterulaceae
Fungi of Brazil
Monotypic Agaricales genera